The men's 300 metre standard rifle event at the 2018 Asian Games in Palembang, Indonesia took place on 24 August at the Jakabaring International Shooting Range.

Schedule
All times are Western Indonesia Time (UTC+07:00)

Records

Results

References

External links
Shooting 300m Standard Rifle Men
 Results at asia-shooting.org

Men's 300 metre standard rifle